Circus Devils is an American art rock band founded in 2001 by Robert Pollard, best known as the lead singer and songwriter of the Dayton, Ohio, band Guided by Voices. The band consists of Pollard (vocals and lyrics), Todd Tobias (music and production), and Tim Tobias (music).

Circus Devils employs a wide spectrum of musical styles ranging from acid rock to ambient soundscapes.  On the band's web site, the music is described as "garage-prog, or "art rock made by cave men."

History 
Circus Devils was originally conceived in 2001 as a side project to Robert Pollard's main work with Guided by Voices.  Between 2001 and 2017, the band released fourteen full-length albums.  Beginning with the release of their first album, Ringworm Interiors, Circus Devils dismissed the styles of Pollard's other musical endeavors for a more experimental approach, taking an ominous and nightmarish tone,  exploring the themes of good and evil. 
According to the group's whimsical website bio, Circus Devils formed because a dog-faced man approached each member on separate occasions to deliver the message, "Circus Devils is Real."   Like this story, the song lyrics are often unsettling fictional tales of horror delivered within deconstructed rock operas. Each Circus Devils album is distinguished by a theme, concept, or production style which sets it apart from the band's other albums.

In 2007, the band's 5th album Sgt. Disco was released on Mike Patton's Ipecac Recordings record label.

In 2016, the band announced that their next record would be their final, titled "Laughs Last".

Band member and producer Todd Tobias authored a book in 2019 titled Circus Devils: See You Inside, published by Tiny Room in The Netherlands.

Discography

Studio albums
 Ringworm Interiors (2001)
 The Harold Pig Memorial (2002)
 Pinball Mars (2003)
 Five (2005)
 Sgt. Disco (2007)
 Ataxia (2008)
 Gringo (2009)
 Mother Skinny (2010)
 Capsized! (2011)
 When Machines Attack (2013)
 My Mind Has Seen the White Trick (2013)
 Escape (2014)
 Stomping Grounds (2015)
 Laughs Last (2017)

Compilations
 Laughs Best (The Kids Eat It Up) (2017)

Reviews
Circus Devils - Ringworm Interiors - Album Review at ALLMUSIC by Bart Bealmear
 Circus Devils - The Harold Pig Memorial - Album Review at ALLMUSIC by Karen E. Graves
 Circus Devils - Pinball Mars - Album Review at ALLMUSIC by Bart Bealmear
Circus Devils - Sgt. Disco - Album Review at PITCHFORK by Adam Moerder (12 September, 2007)
Circus Devils - ATAXIA - Album Review at Indieville (27 October, 2008)
Circus Devils - Gringo - Album Review at ERASING CLOUDS by Dave Heaton (30 March, 2009)
Circus Devils - Mother Skinny - Album Review at POPMATTERS by Matthew Fiander (1 April, 2010)
Circus Devils - Capsized! - Album Review at POPMATTERS

References

External links 
 band web site
 [ Circus Devils at Allmusic.com]
 Robert Pollard's site
 Todd Tobias' site
 Interview with band member Todd Tobias

Alternative rock groups from Ohio
American art rock groups
American psychedelic rock music groups
Musical groups established in 2001
American progressive rock groups
American experimental rock groups
Rock music groups from Ohio
Ipecac Recordings artists